Liangtian Subdistrict is a subdistrict in Linwei District, Weinan, Shaanxi, China. , it has 6 villages under its administration.

See also 
 List of township-level divisions of Shaanxi

References 

Township-level divisions of Shaanxi
Subdistricts of the People's Republic of China
Weinan